Milenio is a major national newspaper in Mexico, owned by Grupo Multimedios.

It is published in 11 cities across Mexico, including Monterrey, Mexico City, Guadalajara, León, Pachuca, Puebla, Villahermosa, Tampico, Torreón, Toluca, and Xalapa. In each local edition they include local content and national news developed by the media group, not only from their newspaper reporters, but also from Multimedios Televisión and Multimedios Radio.

It started in Monterrey as Diario de Monterrey, and expanded to other cities in the first decade of the 21st century.

During elections, Milenio publishes the acclaimed María de las Heras poll, that was the only poll in Mexico to predict the victory of Vicente Fox in 2000.

The newspaper also publishes a biweekly magazine distributed nationwide, and operates the 24-hour news channel Milenio Televisión, which is distributed throughout Mexico via cable and satellite, and over-the-air through the subchannels of its sister network Canal 6, with some American distribution.

The newspaper was criticized for publishing a daily poll which gave President Enrique Peña Nieto an 18-point lead over Andrés Manuel López Obrador 5 days before the election, while the real difference was 6.46%. Ciro Gómez Leyva printed a public apology, adding that they would "retire from electoral polling."

See also
 List of newspapers in Mexico

References

External links
 Milenio: Official Website

Companies based in Monterrey
Spanish-language newspapers
Newspapers published in Mexico
Grupo Multimedios